Saint-Julien-le-Pèlerin (Limousin: Sent Julian lo Peregrin) is a commune in the Corrèze department in central France.

Population

See also
Communes of the Corrèze department

References

Communes of Corrèze